Central Tunnel is a tunnel that runs through the Central Mountain Range, carrying Taiwan Railways Administration's South-link line between Fangshan Station and Guzhuang Station. At , it was the longest railway tunnel in Taiwan when it opened (now second only to the  Xinguanyin Tunnel). The tunnel has a dike and two ventilation shafts.

See also
 Fangshan Station
 Guzhuang Station
 Central Signal Station
 Pu'an Signal Station

External links 

 Third, the South Railway (69.7.1 ~ 73.12) - Rong workers garden

1991 establishments in Taiwan
Buildings and structures in Pingtung County
Buildings and structures in Taitung County
Railway tunnels in Taiwan
Transportation in Pingtung County
Transportation in Taitung County
Tunnels completed in 1990